Jonas Salk Hall at the University of Pittsburgh is a Pennsylvania state and Pittsburgh History and Landmarks Foundation Historic Landmark. The Art Deco building is named after Jonas Salk, who conducted his research on the first polio vaccine in a basement laboratory while on the faculty at the University of Pittsburgh.

History
The main structure of Salk Hall is the former city owned Pittsburgh Municipal Hospital for Contagious Diseases constructed in 1941 on land the university had given to the city.  It was designed by Richard Irving and Theodore Eicholz. The hospital was built as a project by President Roosevelt's Public Works Administration. The 225-bed hospital was originally part of the Medical Center associated with the University and was intended to be used primarily to treat communicable diseases. However, when antibiotics virtually eliminated the need to quarantine patients, the building had become a financial burden on the city.  Therefore, in September 1949, work began on remodeling the building, and it temporarily housed Pitt's School of Public Health. In October 1957, the Municipal Hospital was formally acquired from the city for $1.3 million ($ million today) and renamed Jonas Salk Hall.  For a time, the upper floors of the building served as a residence for students.  Pitt remodeled it to house the School of Dental Medicine and School of Pharmacy in 1961-1962.

Annex
The Salk Hall Annex, a major renovation and three-story addition designed by the architectural firm Deeter, Ritchey, and Sippel for the Dental School, was completed the Terrace Street side of the building in 1967 for a cost of over $5 million ($ million today).  Today, it serves as a main entrance for Salk Hall and the dental clinics.

A new $50.6 million ($ million today) addition and renovation to Salk Hall was announced in January 2010. It will include the construction of an  research tower in the parking area behind the existing building by Ballinger Architects with associates DRS Architects. The new tower is planned to house laboratories and support spaces relocated from their current home in Salk Hall in order to free up space for additional classrooms and offices in the original structure. The target completion date is July, 2014.

Dental Museum
A dental museum is housed in the first floor reception area of Salk Hall. The museum contains a variety of original dental artifacts, including a c. 1910 dental chair, and x-ray machine and instrument cabinet from the 1920s.

Pharmacy Museum
Also contained in Salk Hall is the Elmer H. Grimm Sr. Pharmacy Museum, which opened in the fall of 1996.  Located on the fourth floor, the museum holds pharmacy memorabilia such as drug products, equipment, and sundry products dating back to the early 20th century.  Among the museum's possessions are two hand-carved finials, which were often found over the door or partitions that separated the main part of the pharmacy from the back room where pharmacists did most of their work, an old-fashioned powder mill, and a konseal machine.

References

External links
Salk Hall on Pitt's virtual Campus Tour
Elmer H. Grimm Sr. Pharmacy Museum 
Pitt School of Dental Medicine
Pitt School of Pharmacy
January 1940 Pittsburgh Press article on construction delays and costs

Infrastructure completed in 1941
University of Pittsburgh academic buildings
Pharmacy museums
Medical museums in Pennsylvania
University museums in Pennsylvania
Museums in Pittsburgh
Art Deco architecture in Pennsylvania
Pittsburgh History & Landmarks Foundation Historic Landmarks
Pharmacy in the United States
Dental museums
Medical and health organizations based in Pennsylvania
1931 establishments in Pennsylvania